St. Patrick's Church is a historic church building at 1598 South Main Street in Fall River, Massachusetts. It was built in 1881 from local Fall River granite, and added to the National Register of Historic Places in 1983.

St. Patrick's Parish was established in 1873, as a division of St. Mary's Parish, a predominantly Irish congregation. In 2002, the church was part of a three-parish merger between St. Patrick's, Blessed Sacrament, and Our Lady of the Angels. The new parish is named Parish of the Good Shepherd. In 2018, it became part of the Catholic Community of Central Fall River', a collaborative of parishes that includes Good Shepherd, the Cathedral of St. Mary of the Assumption, and St. Stanislaus Parish and School'''.

See also
National Register of Historic Places listings in Fall River, Massachusetts

References

Roman Catholic churches completed in 1881
19th-century Roman Catholic church buildings in the United States
Roman Catholic churches in Fall River, Massachusetts
Churches on the National Register of Historic Places in Massachusetts
Patrick Keely buildings
Stone churches in Massachusetts
National Register of Historic Places in Fall River, Massachusetts
Granite buildings
1873 establishments in Massachusetts